Kevin is a fictional character in Frank Miller's graphic novel series Sin City, featured prominently in The Hard Goodbye. He is a mute, cannibalistic serial killer who preys on the titular city's prostitutes, The Girls of Old Town. He is protected by the powerful Cardinal Patrick Henry Roark, who also acts as his accomplice. Kevin lives at the Roark family farm, and uses the basement as an execution chamber for his victims; after he kills and eats them, he stuffs and mounts their heads on the walls like hunting trophies.

While he appears harmless and unassuming, Kevin is a fierce, inhumanly fast fighter adept in martial arts; accordingly, the Roark family uses him as an assassin from time to time. He is usually accompanied by his pet wolf, which he feeds whatever parts of his victims he does not eat himself.

Appearances

The Hard Goodbye
The Hard Goodbye establishes Kevin's back story, as related by Cardinal Roark. He first meets Roark when going to him for confession, wracked with guilt over the murders he is committing. Roark eventually comes to believe that Kevin is doing God's work by consuming his victims' souls as well as their bodies, and eventually joins him in cannibalistic rituals. Roark also claims that Kevin is mute by choice, and when he speaks it is with "the voice of an angel".

In the main plot, Kevin kills Marv's one true love, Goldie, at Cardinal Roark's behest when she learns the truth about their murder spree; he then frames Marv for the crime. Marv swears revenge, and cuts a bloody swath through the city's underworld until he learns the identity of the killer he seeks. He then follows Kevin to the Farm, where Kevin surprises him and knocks him unconscious. He also kidnaps and imprisons Marv's parole officer, Lucille, and forces her to watch while he eats her hand.

Marv eventually escapes, however, and confronts Kevin again. This time, Marv overpowers him and subjects him to brutal, systematic torture, eventually sawing his limbs off and feeding him to his pet wolf. Much to Marv's frustration, Kevin does not make a sound the entire time, and dies with a blissful smile on his face.

That Yellow Bastard
Kevin makes a cameo appearance in That Yellow Bastard, set a few years before The Hard Goodbye. He appears at the Farm, sitting in a rocking chair and reading the Bible while Roark Junior tortures Nancy Callahan.

In other media
Kevin is portrayed by Elijah Wood in Robert Rodriguez's 2005 film adaptation of Sin City.

Character notes
Frank Miller has stated in the Sin City: Recut and Extended DVD commentary that Kevin and another supporting character, Miho, are the supernatural beings in Sin City. Miller characterizes them as "demons"; Miho is a good "demon" and Kevin is an evil one.

Reception
In 2011, UGO Networks ranked Kevin together with Miho as #1 in their list "Quiet as the Grave: The Silent Killers of Film and TV".

References

Sin City characters
Dark Horse Comics film characters
Fictional amputees
Fictional serial killers
Fictional cannibals
Comic martial artists
Comics characters introduced in 1991
Crime film characters
Fictional demons and devils
Fictional murdered people
Characters created by Frank Miller (comics)
Fictional assassins in comics
Fictional torturers